Conospermum paniculatum is a shrub endemic to Western Australia.

It blooms between July and November producing blue-white flowers.

It is found on gentle slopes, plains and swampy areas in the South West region of Western Australia where it grows in sandy or clay soils.

References

External links

Eudicots of Western Australia
paniculatum
Endemic flora of Western Australia
Plants described in 1995